Go, Diego, Go! is an American animated educational interactive children's television program that premiered on Nickelodeon on September 6, 2005 in the United States. Created and executive produced by Chris Gifford and Valerie Walsh Valdes, the series is a spin-off of Dora the Explorer and follows Dora's cousin Diego, an 8-year-old boy whose adventures frequently involve rescuing animals and protecting their environment.

Series overview

Episodes

Season 1 (2005–2006)

Season 2 (2006–2008)

Season 3 (2008–2009)  

NOTE: Serena Kerrigan replaces Constanza Sperakis in the role of Alicia.

Season 4 (2009–2010) 
Brandon Zambrano replaces Jake T. Austin in the voice of Diego. 
Gabriela Aisenberg replaces Serena Kerrigan in the voice of Alicia.

NOTE: Brandon Zambrano replaces Jake T. Austin from taking the role of Diego and Gabriela Aisenberg replaces Serena Kerrigan from taking the role of Alicia.

Season 5 (2010–2011)

References 

Lists of American children's animated television series episodes
Lists of Nickelodeon television series episodes